Quirinus of Neuss, sometimes called Quirinus of Rome (which is the name shared by another martyr) is venerated as a martyr and saint of the Catholic and Eastern Orthodox churches. His cult was centered at Neuss in Germany, though he was a Roman martyr.

According to the Catholic Encyclopedia, a Roman martyr named Quirinus was buried in the Catacomb of Prætextatus on the Via Appia. The Martyrologium Hieronymianum (ed. De Rossi-Duchesne, 52) mentions Quirinus' name and place of burial. The Itineraries to the graves of the Roman martyrs (Giovanni Battista De Rossi, "Roma sotterranea", I, 180–1) also mention these two pieces of information.

The Martyrologium Hieronymianum  assigns him under the feast day of April 30, the date that appears in the catalogue of Roman martyrs of the 4th century.

Legend
Quirinus is introduced into the legendary Acts of Sts. Pope Alexander I and Balbina, where it is said he was a tribune (Dufourcq, loc. cit., 175). He is said to have been decapitated in 116. Legends make him a Roman tribune who was ordered with executing Alexander, Eventius, and Theodolus, who had been arrested by order of Trajan. However, after witnessing miracles performed by these three saints, Quirinus converted to Christianity and baptized by Alexander, along with his daughter Balbina.  

Quirin was condemned to have his tongue, hands and feet cut off. According to the popular legend, which is often represented in art, his tongue was offered to a falcon, but the bird refused to eat it: the Acts say nothing of it. The hands and feet were in like manner cast to dogs, and popular tradition adds that they refused to devour them. Afterwards he was drawn by oxen to the place of final execution where he was decapitated. It is believed he was martyred on March 30, before being buried in the catacomb of Prætextatus on the Via Appia.

Veneration

Ado took the name from these Acts and put it in his Martyrology under date of March 30, on which day it used to be found in the Roman Martyrology (Quentin, "Les martyrologes historiques", 490). The latest edition of the Roman Martyrology commemorates Saint Quirinus on April 30.

According to a document from Cologne dating from 1485, Quirinus' body was donated in 1050 by Pope Leo IX to an abbess of Neuss named Gepa (who is called a sister of the pope). In this way the relics came to the Romanesque Church of St. Quirinus at Neuss (Quirinus-Münster) which still exists. A statue of Quirinus sits atop the church (which Jean-Baptiste Bernadotte attempted to plunder during the Napoleonic Wars).

Inhabitants of that city invoked him for aid during Siege of Neuss by Charles the Bold that occurred in 1474–5. His cult spread to Cologne, Alsace, Scandinavia, western Germany, the Netherlands, and Italy, where he became the patron saint of Correggio. Numerous wells and springs were dedicated to him, and he was invoked against the bubonic plague, smallpox, and gout; he was also considered a patron saint of animals. Pilgrims to Neuss sought the Quirinuswasser (Quirinus water) from the Quirinusbrunnen (Quirinus spring or pump-room).

A farmers' saying associated with Quirinus' former feast day of March 30 was "Wie der Quirin, so der Sommer" ("As St. Quirinus' Day goes, so will the summer").

Quirinus, along with Hubertus, Cornelius and Anthony, was venerated as one of the Four Holy Marshals ('Vier Marschälle Gottes) in the Rhineland.  Portraits of Quirinus and of St. Valentine appear at the top of the recto of the Nuremberg Chronicles (Folio CXXII [Geneva]).

References

Further reading
 Walter Bader: St Quirinus zu Neuss. 1955
 
 Max Tauch: Quirinus von Neuss. 2000, 
 Helmut Wessels: Neuss und St. Quirin zu Fuß. 2004, Engl. )
 Erich Wimmer: Quirinus von Neuss. in Lexikon für Theologie und Kirche (LThK) Bd. 8

External links

 San Quirino 
 Quirinus von Rome (von Neuss) 

Converts to Christianity from pagan religions
Saints of Germania
1st-century births
116 deaths
2nd-century deaths
2nd-century Christian martyrs
Animals in Christianity
Legendary Romans